Ann-Louise is a feminine double name. Notable people with the name include:

Ann Louise Bardach, American journalist and non-fiction author
Ann-Louise Edstrand (born 1975), Swedish ice hockey player
Ann Louise Gittleman (born 1949), American nutritionist
Ann-Louise Hanson (born 1944), Swedish singer
Ann-Louise Peters (born 1975), Danish darts player
Ann-Louise Skoglund (born 1962), Swedish female hurdler and short-distance runner

See also
Lilla Ann-Louise, song

Feminine given names
Compound given names